Communauté d'agglomération Ventoux-Comtat Venaissin is the communauté d'agglomération, an intercommunal structure, centred on the town of Carpentras. It is located in the Vaucluse department, in the Provence-Alpes-Côte d'Azur region, southeastern France. Created in 2003, its seat is in Carpentras. Its name refers to the Mont Ventoux and the Comtat Venaissin. Its area is 511.6 km2. Its population was 70,298 in 2019, of which 29,236 in Carpentras proper.

Composition
The communauté d'agglomération consists of the following 25 communes:

Aubignan
Le Barroux
Le Beaucet
Beaumes-de-Venise
Beaumont-du-Ventoux
Bédoin
Caromb
Carpentras
Crillon-le-Brave
Flassan
Gigondas
Lafare
Loriol-du-Comtat
Malaucène
Mazan
Modène
La Roque-Alric
La Roque-sur-Pernes
Saint-Didier
Saint-Hippolyte-le-Graveyron
Saint-Pierre-de-Vassols
Sarrians
Suzette
Vacqueyras
Venasque

References

Ventoux-Comtat Venaissin
Ventoux-Comtat Venaissin